Nicholson station is a Via Rail flag stop station located in the ghost town of Nicholson, Sudbury District, Ontario, Canada on the Sudbury – White River train.

External links
Via Rail page for Nicholson train station

Via Rail stations in Ontario
Railway stations in Sudbury District
Canadian Pacific Railway stations in Ontario